Deathwish is an EP by American deathrock band Christian Death. It consists of demos recorded by the band in 1981, prior to the release of Christian Death's debut album Only Theatre of Pain, but was not released until 1984 by French record label l'Invitation au Suicide.

Deathwish was recorded in 1981 at Orange County Studios in California, prior to the band signing to Frontier Records for Only Theatre of Pain (1982).

Critical reception

In a retrospective review for AllMusic, critic Ned Raggett gave the EP 3 out of 5 stars and wrote that "[the EP is] a great peek into some of the band's roughest beginnings".

Track listing

Personnel
Rozz Williams – lead vocals
Rikk Agnew – guitars
James McGearty – bass guitars
George Belanger – drums

References

External links

 

1984 EPs
Christian Death albums